"Now That We Found Love" (also known as "Now That We've Found Love") is a song written by Kenneth Gamble and Leon Huff and originally recorded by American R&B/soul vocal group The O'Jays for their seventh album, Ship Ahoy (1973).

Heavy D and the Boyz version

American group Heavy D & the Boyz released their very successful dance/house-cover of "Now That We Found Love" in 1991. It was produced by Teddy Riley and remains their biggest hit. The song was released in June as the second single from their third album, Peaceful Journey (1991), and peaked at number two in the UK and number 11 in the US. Its music video was directed by Drew Carolan.

Chart performance
"Now That We Found Love" was very successful on the singles charts on several continents. In Europe, it reached number two in the Netherlands, Sweden and the UK. In the latter, the single peaked in its fourth week at the UK Singles Chart, on July 21, 1991. It was held off the top spot by Bryan Adams' "(Everything I Do) I Do It For You". On the UK Dance Singles Chart, it reached number four. Additionally, the single entered the top 10 also in Austria (8), Belgium (5), Denmark (3), Germany (4), Greece (5), Ireland (6), Norway (6), Spain (5) and Switzerland (4), as well as on the Eurochart Hot 100, where it peaked at number four in September 1991. Outside Europe, it peaked at number-one on the RPM Dance/Urban chart in Canada, number two on the Billboard Hot Dance Club Play chart and number eleven on the Billboard Hot 100 in the US. In Oceania, "Now That We Found Love" was also a top 10 hit in Australia and New Zealand, peaking at number six and ten, respectively. 

"Now That We Found Love" was awarded with a gold record in the United States, with a sale of 500,000 singles.

Critical reception
AllMusic editor Alex Henderson complimented the Heavy D & the Boyz version as "melodic", and "fun and escapist in nature". J.D. Considine from The Baltimore Sun wrote, "If the Hevster can keep serving up singles as infectious as "Now That We Found Love", he'll get few complaints." Larry Flick from Billboard viewed it as a "fab hip-house interpretation" and "an invigorating peak-hour anthem". He also noted that the producer "adds a mainstream gloss that could spark a top 40 breakthrough hit." Henderson and DeVancy for Cashbox stated that this is a song "to look out for". James Bernard from Entertainment Weekly called it a "fast-paced hip-house jam". James Hamilton from Music Week named it Pick of the Week in the category of Dance, declaring it as a "jaunty singalong stereo rap". Martin Aston from the RM Dance Update felt that the track "has been given a bouncy, slick gloss, with a typically snappy slice of rap from the heavyweight poet." Eric Deggans from The Pittsburgh Press described it as "reggae-flavored". Marc Andrews from Smash Hits complimented it as "rap at its most jolly and fun-filled".

Retrospective response
In an 2021 retrospective review, Jesse Ducker from Albumism described "Now That We Found Love" as "a catchy and extremely successful pairing with producer Riley, featuring Aaron Hall’s powerful vocals on the chorus. The song takes some of its inspiration from the O'Jays' song of the same name, but has the most in common with reggae group Third World’s version of the track. Heavy D plays to his strengths here, celebrating the love he’s cultivated and finding new ways to explore its dynamics." In 2017, BuzzFeed ranked it number 59 in their list of "The 101 Greatest Dance Songs Of the '90s". Australian music channel Max included it in their list of "1000 Greatest Songs of All Time" in 2013.

Music video
The accompanying music video for "Now That We Found Love" was directed by Drew Carolan. It features Heavy D and dancers performing in an urban backstreet. The dancers are wearing yellow raincoats. At the beginning, as the singer performs, a woman glances through a blind in her window. Later she emerges on a balcony, watching the singer. Heavy D is mostly seen wearing a red jacket, but also occasionally wears a raincoat in various colors, such as black and green. Several guys on the street are playing games with cards or dices. A DJ plays with his turntable. Many people are dancing. Towards the end, the woman comes walking on the street, meeting Heavy D. Then the two are walking away together from the partying crowd on the street. The video was later published on Heavy D's official YouTube channel in October 2009, and had generated more than 40 million views as of September 2022.

Track listing

Charts

Weekly charts

Year-end charts

Certifications

Other cover versions; samples
A reggae-disco hit by the reggae band Third World (1978). This version was released as a single in 1978 by Island Records and peaked at number 10 in the UK. In the US, it went to number 47 on the Billboard Hot 100 and number 9 on the Hot Soul Singles chart.
 A sample of the song is used in the Stereo MC's chart hit "Connected". It's the passage with the words "Make daddy shoot".

References

External links

1973 songs
1978 singles
1991 singles
Heavy D songs
The O'Jays songs
Songs written by Leon Huff
Songs written by Kenny Gamble
Song recordings produced by Teddy Riley
Reggae fusion songs
Island Records singles
Uptown Records singles
Songs written by Heavy D